Asclepias oenotheroides is a species of milkweed, commonly known as zizotes milkweed or side-cluster milkweed. It is native to the south-western United States and Central America.

References 

oenotheroides